The Chiltern Way Academy (established April 2016) is a secondary phase specialist school for boys and girls with social, emotional communication and interaction difficulties (SECID). All of the students are between 11 and 18 years of age.

The school provides education, care and therapies for the range of need that exists across the behaviour spectrum.  This includes young people with social and emotional needs and young people with a diagnosis of ASD (Autistic Spectrum Disorder).

The Chiltern Way Academy has two sites, one based in Prestwood and the other based in Wendover.

References

External links
 Chiltern Way Academy official website

Special schools in Buckinghamshire
Academies in Buckinghamshire
Special secondary schools in England